Bieuzy is a former commune in the Morbihan department in Brittany in northwestern France. On 1 January 2019, it was merged into the new commune Pluméliau-Bieuzy. Inhabitants of Bieuzy are called Bieuzyates.

Sights

Prehistoric vestige 
 Dolmen of Kermabon.

Church and chapels 
 Notre-Dame, 16th century, in the form of a Latin cross.
 The chapel of Saint Gildas 16th century. Situated on the banks of the  Blavet River, the chapel leans against an enormous rock which hangs over it. There is the natural grotto in which Saint Gildas may have taken shelter on his arrival from Cornwall in England. He is thought to have shared his hermitage with his disciple Bieuzy.
 The chapel of the Trinité (Trinity) at Castenec.
 The chapel of Saint-Samson, 16th century.
 the chapel of the Vraie-Croix (True Cross), 16th century.

Fountain 
 The fountain of Saint Bieuzy, 16th century.

Mill 
 The flour mill of Rimaison.

Curiosities 
 Ruins of the chateau of Rimaison, 16th century.
 The chateau of Kerven (the ruins were still visible in 1845).
 Seigneurial houses at Bourg, 16th and 17th centuries.
 The Gallic stele of Castennec.
 Medieval tombstone, 13th century, discovered in 1971.

Memorial 
 This memorial, located near the Gulf of Rimaison, is in memory of 14 Resistance fighters and French parachutists who were shot and killed at this spot on 18 July 1944.

See also
Communes of the Morbihan department

References

External links
 Cultural Heritage 

Former communes of Morbihan
Populated places disestablished in 2019